Miami Social is an American reality television series on Bravo that debuted on July 14, 2009. The series chronicles the lives of seven friends as they lived, worked, and socialized in South Beach, Miami. They all met weekly for cocktails at the Gansevoort Hotel to catch up with each other's busy lives.

Cast

Sorah Daiha
Sorah is a business woman who carefully balances work and play. She is a realtor and property manager and also works in the home remodeling industry. Having "been there and done that" with the South Beach party scene, Sorah enjoys chilling at the beach or chic hotel pools, and hitting up the hottest South Beach restaurants for nights out with the girls. Divorced from ladies man George, she still maintains a somewhat complex friendship with him despite their close living quarters – which complicates things with her current boyfriend, Gonzalo, who also lives in the same building.

Michael Cohen
Michael is one of Miami's "in the know," tapped into the media world as a freelance editor covering local entertainment and A-listcelebrities for magazines such as In Touch Weekly. He also commentates for local and national TV shows such as CNN’s Showbiz Tonight. At the time of the series, he is working hard at launching his own website, an e-commerce site that will cover all that is fashionable. His job allows him the freedom to explore the hottest Miami locales, including lunch meetings at the chicest hotel pools and cocktails on the hottest rooftop lounges. A lover of the outdoors, he enjoys life with his three-year-old poodle, Austin, all while looking for love in the sometimes complicated and dramatic world of South Beach. His episode reviews have appeared on The Huffington Post since Miami Social's premiere.

Maria Lankina
Maria is a no-nonsense Russian bombshell who has taken Miami by storm. After moving to the city in 2005, it took her no time to make a mark on the scene, and only is seen at the chicest spots in South Beach. She currently works as an art director and freelance photographer after studying at the prestigious Miami Ad School, and has had the opportunity to travel the world for her job. She describes herself as "forward, rebellious and fiery," but is a passionate and devoted mom to 13-year-old Angelika.

Katrina Campins
Katrina epitomizes the saying "work hard, play hard." A no-nonsense approach to business made her a powerhouse at a young age, and she is one of Miami's hottest real estate agents, ranking in the top 1/2 percent of realtors nationwide. She founded and owns her own real estate brokerage firm, The Campins Company, which caters to an elite clientele, including celebrities and athletes. She was also one of the stars of the first season of season 1 of The Apprentice. Born and raised in Miami, this Cuban-American bombshell knows the ins and outs of the city and is tapped into the nightlife and a staple on the social scene. Never one to sit still, Katrina finds herself struggling with the rising success of her company versus the romantic lows of her marriage.

Hardy Hill
Hardy is the man to know in Miami. He is the President and CEO of Hill Hospitality Group, and is the host of the hottest weekly parties at the chicest clubs, restaurants and hotels in South Beach. His job keeps him at the forefront of the wild Miami nightlife, where work and play are sometimes blurred. Described as "opinionated and strong-willed," he strives to balance his career and the pressures of the nightlife with the thought of settling down with the right woman. Hardy also appeared as a contestant on season 2 of the American version of Big Brother.

George French
George is the quintessential "man about town" in South Beach. He is a high-powered mortgage banker and also owns his own investment and consulting firm, and says making money is one of his primary hobbies. George is divorced from fellow castmate Sorah. They still live in the same apartment building and have remained close friends, despite his fiery and tumultuous relationship with current girlfriend Lina. By day, George's focus is on his career, but by night, he's regularly seen around South Beach and is a regular at the hottest clubs in town. Never one to shy away from drama, George stands at a crossroads in his life, trying to balance his party animal ways with settling down and making things work with Lina.

Ariel Stein
Ariel is one of the key players in the Miami nightlife scene, a regular at the hottest parties and clubs in town and always on the VIP list. Never one to sit still, he works as one of Miami’s premiere fashion producers and also serves as Vice President of one of the family business, 20/20 Vision Management, Inc. Ariel counts his social life as his other occupation, and is personal friends with some the top fashion designers and celebrities. There is never a dull moment with Ariel, who considers the posh area of South Beach his personal playground. Tapped into the fashion, entertainment and celebrity world of Miami, Ariel continues to make his mark as part of the fast-paced "It Crowd."

Episodes

Ratings
Miami Social has been met with few viewers, low ratings, and negative press. The network thus attempted to create a second season where the show would be recompiled into another series called Miami Social Club, but eventually by February 2011 the network decided instead to go with a different concept and instead structured the Miami Social Club idea into another extension of their The Real Housewives franchise. The filmed footage premiered as The Real Housewives of Miami on February 22, 2011.

References

External links
 
 
 Michael Cohen's site on The Huffington Post

2000s American reality television series
2009 American television series debuts
2009 American television series endings
Bravo (American TV network) original programming
English-language television shows
Television shows set in Miami